Peter Malcolm Lucas  (born 7 October 1938) is a Welsh former footballer who played as a right-half. He made four appearances for the Wales national team.

Club career
After beginning his career at non-League Bradley Rangers, Lucas signed for Leyton Orient in 1958 and was part of the team that played in the First Division in 1962–63. In 1964 he joined Norwich City, where he played 183 league games before joining Torquay United in 1970, where he made 122 appearances.

International career
Lucas made his Wales national team debut on 11  April 1962 against Northern Ireland. His fourth and last cap was on 21 November 1962 against England.

Coaching career
After leaving Torquay, he became player-manager at Gorleston, managing them from 1976 until 1980.

See also
 List of Wales international footballers (alphabetical)

References

1938 births
Living people
Welsh footballers
Footballers from Wrexham
Association football midfielders
Wales international footballers
Bradley Rangers F.C. players
Leyton Orient F.C. players
Norwich City F.C. players
Torquay United F.C. players
Gorleston F.C. players
Welsh football managers
Gorleston F.C. managers